Trenton High School is a public high school in Trenton, Michigan, one of four schools in the Trenton Public School District. The school serves the city of Trenton and is a magnet school for special education students, specifically for those with hearing disabilities, from across Downriver.
Enrollment for the 2012-13 school year was about 1200.

Notable alumni
Jim Diamond is an American music producer, musician, and runs Ghetto Recorders studio, formerly located in Detroit, MI.
 Ann Marie Lipinski, former Chicago Tribune editor and Pulitzer Prize winner, who was editor of the Trojan Trumpet , graduated in 1974.
 Anthony Bass, current Toronto Blue Jays relief pitcher.
Bradley A. Smith, Law professor, a Clinton appointee to the Federal Election Commission, elected Chairman of the Commission in 2004, was born and raised in Trenton, elected Senior Class President, and graduated Trenton High in 1976.
 Mary Lynn Rajskub, comedian and actress, was born and raised in Trenton, and graduated from Trenton High School in 1989.
 J. J. Putz, a relief pitcher for the Seattle Mariners, New York Mets, Chicago White Sox and Arizona Diamondbacks as well as a 2007 MLB All-Star Game participant, was raised in Trenton, and graduated from Trenton High School in 1995.
Professional Comedian Tim Slagle was raised in Trenton, and graduated Trenton High in 1976
Psychobilly frontman Jim Leedy, of the cult band Elvis Hitler was born and raised in Trenton, and graduated Trenton High in 1979.
 Science fiction author Sarah Zettel was raised in Trenton and is a 1984 graduate of Trenton High School.
Toronto Blue Jays starting pitcher Matt Shoemaker grew up in Trenton, and graduated from Trenton High School in 2004.
Andy Greene, professional hockey player for the New York Islanders 
Tom Burkhard is American television producer and writer.
 Former NHL player Larry DePalma was born in Trenton and is a 1983 Trenton High School graduate.

References

External links

 Trenton Public Schools

Public high schools in Michigan
Educational institutions established in 1900
Schools in Wayne County, Michigan
Magnet schools in Michigan
1900 establishments in Michigan